{{Infobox boxing match
| fight date = March 4, 1995
| Fight Name = Showdown of Champions
| location = Convention Hall, Atlantic City, New Jersey, U.S.
| image = 
| fighter2 = Julio César Vásquez
| nickname2 = El Zurdo
| purse2 = $500,000
| record2 = 53–1 (35 KO)
| height2 = 5 ft 10 in
| weight2 = 153+3/4 lb
| style2 = Southpaw
| hometown2 = Santa Fe, Argentina
| recognition2 = WBA super welterweight champion
| fighter1 = Pernell Whitaker
| nickname1 = Sweet Pea
| record1 = 34–1–1 (15 KO)
| purse1 = $1,500,000
| hometown1 = Norfolk, Virginia, U.S.
| height1 = 5 ft 5+1/2 in
| weight1 = 153+3/4 lbs
| style1 = Southpaw
| recognition1 = WBC welterweight champion[[The Ring (magazine)|The Ring]] No. 1 ranked pound-for-pound fighter3-division world champion
| titles = WBA super welterweight title
| result = Whitaker wins via 12-round unanimous decision (118-110, 118-107, 116-110)
}}

Pernell Whitaker vs. Julio César Vásquez, billed as Showdown of Champions, was a professional boxing match contested on March 4, 1995 for the WBA super welterweight title.

Background
In February 1995, reigning WBC welterweight champion, American Pernell Whitaker, officially announced that he would be moving up in weight to challenge Argentine Julio César Vásquez for the latter's WBA super welterweight title.  Whitaker was seeking to become the fourth man in boxing history to win a world title in four different divisions joining only Sugar Ray Leonard, Thomas Hearns and Roberto Durán. Vásquez had reigned as super welterweight champion for over two years and had made 10 successful title defenses , but was virtually unknown to American audiences and had never been on as big a stage as he would be for his fight with Whitaker, something Whitaker claimed would be a detriment for him. Whitaker's time in the super welterweight division was expected to last only this fight, as he announced his intentions to go back down to welterweight should he win. Prior to the bout, Whitaker's long-time trainer George Benton had departed following a dispute with Lou Duva, whom both managed and co-trained Whitaker under his company Main Events. Benton'split from Main Event'' was acrimonious, claiming that Duva "didn't know boxing" and Whitaker was "arrogant and stubborn." To fill the void left by Benton, Ronnie Shields took over as Whitaker's head trainer.

The fight
Whitaker would have little trouble with Vásquez, winning by an easy unanimous decision. However, for the second consecutive fight, Whitaker was knocked down by his opponent. Vásquez would score the knockdown after Whitaker showboated by dropping his hands and was caught off balance with a left hand from Vásquez, though he would recover. As the fight went on, a frustrated Vásquez was warned numerous times for holding and hitting and was deducted one point in each of the ninth and 11th rounds. When fight ended and went to the scorecards, Whitaker won clearly on all three with scores of 118–107, 118–110 and 116–110.

Fight card

References

1995 in boxing
1995 in sports in New Jersey
Boxing on HBO
March 1995 sports events in the United States
Boxing matches at Boardwalk Hall